The Appleton Water Tower is a Victorian water tower located in Sandringham, Norfolk. It was constructed in 1877 to improve the quality of the water supply to the nearby Sandringham House and its estate. Accommodation was provided within the tower on the ground and first floors for the water tower custodian, whilst the second floor above the water tank provides a viewing platform. All floors are served by a spiral staircase adjoining the tower.

The tower is now leased and operated by the Landmark Trust as a holiday let.

References

External links
Landmark Trust page for the tower
Landmark Trust history sheet for Appleton water Tower

Landmark Trust properties in England
Towers in Norfolk
Buildings and structures completed in 1877
Water towers in the United Kingdom
1877 establishments in England